Tô Quang Trung (born June 8, 1984) is a Vietnamese professional basketball player for the Thang Long Warriors of the Vietnam Basketball Association (VBA) and Saigon Heat of the ASEAN Basketball League (ABL).

Pro career
Quang Trung joined the Heat before the start of the 2013 ABL season.

Career statistics

VBA

|-
| style="text-align:left;"| 2016
| style="text-align:left;"| Cantho
| 15 || 12 || 25.3 || .310 || .220 || .770 || 4.2 || 2.2 || .7 || .1 || 7.4
|- class"sortbottom"
| style="text-align:left;"| 2017
| style="text-align:left;"| Thang Long
| 21 || 16 || 30.1 || .410 || .340 || .730 || 2.9 || 2.1 || 2.6 || .1 || 14.5
|- class"sortbottom"
| style="text-align:left;"| 2018
| style="text-align:left;"| Thang Long
| 16 || 3 || 19 || .370 || .300 || .710 || 2.1 || .9 || 1.2 || .0 || 10.9
|- class"sortbottom"
| style="text-align:center;" colspan="2"| Career
| 52 || 31 || 25 || .360 || .290 || .740 || 3.1 || 1.7 || 1.5 || .0 || 10.9

References

External links
 Career statistics and player information from ASEANBasketballLeague.com

1985 births
Living people
Vietnamese basketball players
Saigon Heat players
Shooting guards
People from Cần Thơ